Bertie County (with both syllables stressed) is a county located in the northeast area of the U.S. state of North Carolina. As of the 2020 census, the population was 17,934. Its county seat is Windsor. The county was created in 1722 as Bertie Precinct and gained county status in 1739.

History
The county was formed as Bertie Precinct in 1722 from the part of Chowan Precinct of Albemarle County lying west of the Chowan River. It was named for James Bertie, his brother Henry Bertie, or perhaps both, each having been one of the Lords Proprietors of Carolina.

In 1729 parts of Bertie Precinct, Chowan Precinct, Currituck Precinct, and Pasquotank Precinct of Albemarle County were combined to form Tyrrell Precinct. With the abolition of Albemarle County in 1739, all of its constituent precincts became separate counties. As population of settlers increased, in 1741 parts of Bertie County were organized as Edgecombe County and Northampton County. Finally, in 1759 parts of Bertie, Chowan, and Northampton counties were combined to form Hertford County. Bertie's boundaries have remained the same since then.

This mostly rural county depended on the agricultural economy well into the 20th century. In the colonial and antebellum eras, tobacco and cotton were the chief commodity crops, worked by African slaves. After the Civil War, agriculture continued to be important to the county. In the 21st century, developers have referred to it as being within the Inner Banks region, which is increasingly attracting retirees and buyers of second homes, because of its beaches and landscapes.

Geography

National protected area 
 Roanoke River National Wildlife Refuge

State and local protected areas/sites 
 Bertie County Game Land
 Historic Hope Plantation
 Jamesville Wildlife Preserve
 Lewiston Woodville Preserve
 Salmon Creek State Natural Area

Major water bodies 
 Albemarle Sound
 Beaverdam Swamp
 Cashie River
 Chowan River
 Chinkapin Swamp
 Cucklemaker Creek
 Cypress Swamp
 Falt Swamp Creek
 Hoggard Mill Creek
 Loosing Swamp
 Middle River
 Quioccosin Creek
 Roanoke River
 Stoney Creek
 Wahton Swamp
 Wildcat Swamp

Adjacent counties
 Hertford County - north
 Chowan County - east
 Washington County - southeast
 Martin County - south
 Halifax County - west
 Northampton County - northwest

Major highways
  (Concurrency with US 17)

Major infrastructure 
 Sans Souci Ferry, river ferry across the Cashie River

Demographics

2020 census

As of the 2020 United States census, there were 17,934 people, 7,909 households, and 4,733 families residing in the county.

2010 census
As of the 2010 United States Census, there were 21,282 people living in the county. 62.5% were Black or African American, 35.2% White, 0.5% Asian, 0.5% Native American, 0.5% of some other race and 0.9% of two or more races. 1.3% were Hispanic or Latino (of any race).

2000 census
As of the census of 2000, there were 19,773 people, 7,743 households, and 5,427 families living in the county. The population density was 28 people per square mile (11/km2). There were 9,050 housing units at an average density of 13 per square mile (5/km2). The racial makeup of the county was 62.34% Black or African American, 36.30% White, 0.44% Native American, 0.11% Asian, 0.01% Pacific Islander, 0.33% from other races, 0.48% from two or more races. 0.99% of the population were Hispanic or Latino of any race.

There were 7,743 households, out of which 29.70% had children under the age of 18 living with them, 46.00% were married couples living together, 20.10% had a female householder with no husband present, and 29.90% were non-families. 27.00% of all households were made up of individuals, and 13.10% had someone living alone who was 65 years of age or older. The average household size was 2.53 and the average family size was 3.07.

In the county, the population was spread out, with 26.10% under the age of 18, 7.70% from 18 to 24, 26.40% from 25 to 44, 23.80% from 45 to 64, and 16.00% who were 65 years of age or older. The median age was 39 years. For every 100 females there were 87.60 males. For every 100 females age 18 and over, there were 82.00 males.

The median income for a household in the county was $25,177, and the median income for a family was $30,186. Males had a median income of $26,866 versus $18,318 for females. The per capita income for the county was $14,096. About 19.30% of families and 26% of the population were below the poverty line, including 30.70% of those under age 18 and 28.30% of those age 65 or over.

Government and politics
Bertie County is a member of the Mid-East Commission regional council of governments. The County Sheriff is the chief law enforcement officer.

Education
Public schools in the county are managed by Bertie County Schools. Notable schools in Bertie county include Bertie High School, Lawrence Academy, and Bethel Assembly Christian Academy. The North Carolina Department of Public Instruction rated the county school system as "low-performing" for the 2021–2022 school year.

Communities

Towns

 Askewville
 Aulander
 Colerain
 Kelford
 Lewiston Woodville
 Powellsville
 Roxobel
 Windsor (county seat and largest town)

Townships

 Colerain
 Indian Woods
 Merry Hill
 Mitchells
 Roxobel
 Snakebite
 Whites
 Windsor
 Woodville

Unincorporated communities

 Baker Town
 Buena Vista
 Elm Grove
 Gatlinsville
 Greens Cross
 Hexlena
 Merry Hill
 Perrytown
 Pine Ridge
 Rosemead
 Sans Souci
 Spring Branch
 Todds Cross
 Trap
 Woodard
 Whites Cross

Population ranking
The population ranking of the following table is based on 2022 estimate of Bertie County.

† county seat

See also
 List of counties in North Carolina
 National Register of Historic Places listings in Bertie County, North Carolina
 List of Highway Historical Markers in Bertie County, North Carolina
 List of North Carolina State Parks#State Natural Areas
 List of future Interstate Highways
 Meherrin Indian Tribe, state-recognized tribe that resides in the county

References

External links

 
 
 Historic Hope Plantation
 —a documentary film about an education project in Bertie County
 —a documentary film about education in Bertie County

 
1739 establishments in North Carolina
Populated places established in 1739
Black Belt (U.S. region)
Majority-minority counties in North Carolina